Fairfield is an small, rural, unincorporated village in northeastern Billings County, North Dakota, United States. It lies along U.S. Route 85, northeast of the city of Medora, the county seat of Billings County.  Its elevation is 2,756 feet (840 m).  It has a cafe, an elementary school, and the post office serving the ZIP code of 58627.

Fairfield is part of the Dickinson Micropolitan Statistical Area.

Climate
This climatic region is typified by large seasonal temperature differences, with warm to hot (and often humid) summers and cold (sometimes severely cold) winters.  According to the Köppen Climate Classification system, Fairfield has a humid continental climate, abbreviated "Dfb" on climate maps.

References

Unincorporated communities in Billings County, North Dakota
Unincorporated communities in North Dakota
Dickinson, North Dakota micropolitan area